Ricacorp Properties Limited is one of the largest real estate agency companies in Hong Kong, providing residential, industrial, commercial, retail and car-parking spaces property agency services. Meanwhile, it also offers immigration consultation, surveying, auction and mortgage referral services for all types of properties. As of the end of 2018, the company has more than 220 branches and around 3,000 staff in Hong Kong. 

The company initially focused on the residential sector in Hong Kong. To catch up with the rapid development in the property market, Ricacorp branched out to various sectors including commercial, industrial, retail, and overseas market in recent years. In 2005, the company set up Ricacorp (C.I.R) Properties and Ricacorp (Macau) Properties limited. Till 2018, it established Ricacorp (Zhuhai) Properties limited to enter the Greater Bay area market. The Surveyors Department and Ricacorp Overseas Property & Immigration Consultant Limited were also set up to enhance related services in the same year.

Link
Ricacorp Properties Limited

References

Real estate companies established in 1981
Property agencies of Hong Kong